Tao Zeru (born December 7, 1953) is a Chinese film and television actor. He was born in Nanjing, Jiangsu. He was a graduate of the Nanjing University of the Arts. He was the 1989 co-recipient of the Golden Rooster Award for Best Actor. He was a 1996 recipient of the Flying Apsaras Award for Outstanding Actor.

Filmography

Film

Television

References

1953 births
Living people
Recipients of the Golden Rooster Award for Best Actor
20th-century Chinese male actors
21st-century Chinese male actors
Male actors from Nanjing
Nanjing University of the Arts alumni